A privately run packet service for mail existed in British Guiana in 1796, and continued for a number of years.  Postage stamps of Britain were used in those days at Georgetown (Demerara) and Berbice.  The first adhesive stamps produced by British Guiana were issued in 1850.

British Guiana is famous among philatelists for its early postage stamps, some of them considered to be among the rarest, most expensive stamps in the world.  These include the unique British Guiana 1c magenta from 1856, which sold in 1980 for close to $1 million.

In June 2014 the 1856 British Guiana one-cent magenta stamp was sold at auction in New York, to an anonymous bidder, for $9.5m (£5.6m) at auction in New York, a world record.

Independence 

In 1966 the country achieved independence from the United Kingdom, and changed its name to Guyana.  Later stamps were issued by Guyana.

See also 
Arthur D. Ferguson
Postage stamps and postal history of Guyana
Revenue stamps of British Guiana

References and sources
References

Sources
 W.A. Townsend and F.G. Howe, Postage Stamps and Postal History of British Guiana, London, Royal Philatelic Society (August 1970)

Further reading
Proud, Ted. The Postal History of British Guiana. Proud-Bailey Co. Ltd., 2000. 
  L. N. Williams, "British Guiana's Cottonreels", Encyclopedia of Rare and Famous Stamps, v.I, pp.13-23. David Feldman (1992)

External links 
The British Guiana Study Circle.
The British West Indies Study Circle.
The British Caribbean Philatelic Study Group.
Guyana Philatelic Society

Philately of British Guiana
Postage stamps of British Guiana